The Jeru language, Aka-Jeru (also known as Yerawa, not to be confused with Järawa), is a nearly extinct Great Andamanese language, of the Northern group. Jeru was spoken in the interior and south coast of North Andaman and on Sound Island. A koiné of Aka-Jeru and other northern Great Andamanese languages was once spoken on Strait Island; the last semi-fluent speaker of this, Nao Jr., died in 2009.

History
As the numbers of Great Andamanese progressively declined over the succeeding decades, the various Great Andamanese tribes either disappeared altogether or became amalgamated through intermarriage. By 1994, the 38 remaining Great Andamanese who could trace their ancestry and culture back to the original tribes belonged to only three of them (Jeru, Bo, and Cari).

The resulting Great Andamanese language was based on Jeru or a creole based on several languages, of which Jeru was a primary component. The last fluent speaker, Nao, died in 2009.

Grammar
See Great Andamanese languages for more general grammatical description.

Great Andamanese koiné
Great Andamanese koiné is based primarily on Jeru, with lexical and grammatical influence from other North Great Andamanese languages (Aka-Bo, Aka-Kora and Aka-Cari). It is a head-marking polysynthetic and agglutinative language with a SOV pattern. It has a very elaborate system for marking inalienability, with seven possessive markers reflecting different body-divisions. These markers appear as proclitics that classify a large number of nouns as dependent categories. It is proposed that the Great Andamanese conceptualise their world through these interdependencies and thus the grammar encodes this important phenomenon in every grammatical category expressing referential, attributive and predicative meaning.

The Great Andamanese koiné has a seven-vowel system.

Vocabulary

Koiné vocabulary:

 Column in yellow denotes loanword derived from Hindi

Grammatical features
With respect to the Great Andamanese family, the use of proclitics in Great Andamanese language shows how the language family is unique in such a way that the body division markers that appear as proclitics pervade the entire grammatical system of the language, a fact not shared by any other known language of the world so far.

Great Andamanese place names

Sample text
The following is a sample text in Present Great Andamanese, in Devanagari, the Latin script, and IPA.

References

Bibliography
 Raoul Zamponi. 2022. ''A Grammar of Akajeru : Fragments of a Traditional North Andamanese Dialect.

External links
 Vanishing Voices of the Great Andamanese- VOGA
 Aka-Jeru language- Omniglot

Agglutinative languages
Great Andamanese languages
Extinct languages of Asia
Languages of India
Languages extinct in the 2000s